In Greek mythology, Scamandrius (Skamándrios) is a Trojan warrior who fought in the Trojan war and was slain by Menelaus in battle.

Mythology 
The Trojan Scamandrius was the son of a man named Strophius, and trained in archery by the hunting goddess Artemis herself, and with her guidance he excelled in the use of bow and arrow. Scamandrius fought in the Trojan war, and was slain in battle during the ninth year of the war by Menelaus, Helen's husband, who struck him with his spear in his back as he ran away. Scamandrius fell on his face.

See also 
 Rhesus of Thrace
 Orion
 Meriones
 Scamander

References

Bibliography 
 Homer, The Iliad with an English Translation by A.T. Murray, PhD in two volumes. Cambridge, MA., Harvard University Press; London, William Heinemann, Ltd. 1924. Online version at the Perseus Digital Library.
 Smith, William, Dictionary of Greek and Roman Biography and Mythology, London. John Murray: printed by Spottiswoode and Co., New-Street Square and Parliament Street, 1873. Online version at the Perseus Digital Library.

People of the Trojan War
Retinue of Artemis
Mythological archers
Anatolian characters in Greek mythology
Trojans
Deeds of Artemis